Haplanthus is a genus of flowering plants belonging to the family Acanthaceae.

Its native range is Southern China to Tropical Asia.

Species:

Haplanthus hygrophiloides 
Haplanthus laxiflorus 
Haplanthus ovatus 
Haplanthus rosulatus

References

Acanthaceae
Acanthaceae genera